Diana Nausėdienė ( Nepaitė; born 9 July 1964) is a Lithuanian business manager and lecturer, she is the wife of the current President of Lithuania Gitanas Nausėda and has served as the First Lady of Lithuania since 12 July 2019.

Early life

Nausėdienė was born in Klaipėda, Lithuania where she was brought up in a traditional Lithuanian household. Nausėdienė's father was the captain of a long distance fishing boat and her mother was an accountant, she has a sister who is three years her elder.

Career and education

In 1987, Nausėdienė graduated from the Kaunas Polytechnic Institute Faculty of Light Industry (now Kaunas University of Technology). After graduation, Nausėdienė worked for H&M Hennes & Mauritz GBC AB where she performed quality management and standards maintenance, before becoming a lecturer at the Vilnius University International Business School.

Speaking at an event on women's leadership in September 2020, Nausėdienė caused controversy when she argued that increasing the share of women in any given field did not automatically lead to better outcomes, giving education as an example. Commentators accused Nausėdienė of blaming women for the ills in Lithuania's education system, saying she had completely missed the root of the problem.

Honours

Foreign honours
 : Grand Cross of the Order of the Crown (24 October 2022)

References

|-

1964 births
20th-century Lithuanian people
First ladies of Lithuania
People from Klaipėda
Living people
Grand Crosses of the Order of the Crown (Belgium)